Mateo Gil Rodríguez (born 23 September 1972, Las Palmas, Spain) is a Spanish film director, screenwriter, second unit director, assistant director, cinematographer, editor and producer.

He co-wrote most of Alejandro Amenábar's films with him, and also served as second unit or assistant director in two of this films. Amenábar's The Sea Inside, which Gil co-wrote, won the Academy Award for Best Foreign Language Film.

He was nominated for seven Goya Awards including Best New Director and Best Director, and won four: Best Original Screenplay for The Sea Inside and Agora, Best Adapted Screenplay for The Method and Best Short Film - Fiction for Dime que yo.

Filmography

Film

Short Film

Television

References

External links

1972 births
Living people
Spanish male screenwriters
Spanish film producers
Spanish film directors
Spanish television directors
Film directors from the Canary Islands
People from Las Palmas